Elliott Christopher Cowdin (March 3, 1886 - January 6, 1933) was a member of the Lafayette Escadrille who downed three German planes. He was

Queens, New York City to John Elliot Cowdin and Gertrude Cheever. He died on January 6, 1933, in Palm Beach, Florida.

References

External links

Lafayette Escadrille
1886 births
1933 deaths
People from Queens, New York